Serrata cylindrata is a species of sea snail, a marine gastropod mollusk in the family Marginellidae, the margin snails.

Description
The length of the shell attains 3.9 mm.

Distribution
This marine species occurs off New Caledonia (depth range 305–310 m.)

References

 Boyer, F. (2008). The genus Serrata Jousseaume, 1875 (Caenogastropoda: Marginellidae) in New Caledonia. in: Héros, V. et al. (Ed.) Tropical Deep-Sea Benthos 25. Mémoires du Muséum national d'Histoire naturelle (1993). 196: 389–436.

Marginellidae
Gastropods described in 2008